Allotinus luzonensis is a butterfly in the family Lycaenidae. It was described by John Nevill Eliot in 1967. It is found on Luzon in the Philippines.

References

Butterflies described in 1967
Allotinus